Lukáš Derner (born August 24, 1983) is a Czech professional ice hockey player. He plays defence for HC Liberec in the Czech Extraliga. He began his career with HC Liberec in the season 1999-2000.

External links

1983 births
HC Bílí Tygři Liberec players
HC Plzeň players
Living people
Sportspeople from Liberec
Czech ice hockey defencemen
HC Benátky nad Jizerou players